Astronomy and spirituality have long been intertwined and closely related, mostly after their inception as mainstream subjects. When man started to take off the planet, psychological and cognitive changes were reported by people who directly interacted with outer space, either in visual manner or in exposure, demonstrated a quality of being furiously motivated and concerned about the Earth.

Background 
Even though Astronomy and Spirituality may appear to be two separate topics, they both meet at a common ground, looking for answers in the same area: the cosmos. Both Astronomy and Spirituality have been utilized for many millenniums. Looking at numerous ancient civilizations and their worship of the Sun, Moon, and stars, we can see how many societies related the two in ways that made it appear as if they were one practice.

Ancient Egyptians 
Astronomy is shown to portray the foundations of Ancient Egyptian mythology. They believed that the world as we know it began on a hillside just outside of what would become present-day Cairo. There, they established their most renowned spiritual temple and civilization, Heliopolis, or the City of the Sun. The hillside where Heliopolis would be erected was thought to be where the first apparition of the Sun god Ra and the creator god Atum occurred.

See also 
 Astronomy and religion
 Astronomy and Christianity

References 

Astronomy
Spirituality
Philosophy of astronomy